Paul Porcasi (1 January 1879 – 8 August 1946) was an Italian actor. He appeared in more than 140 films between 1917 and 1945.

Biography 
Porcasi was born in Palermo, Sicily, and sang with the Metropolitan Opera.

Porcasi performed on the New York stage from 1916 to 1928. One of his early non-operatic productions was The Country Boy.  He ended his theatrical career with the role of Nick Verdis in Broadway, which ran for 603 performances (16 September 1926 – 11 February 1928) at the Broadhurst Theatre. He reprised the role of Nick the Greek in Universal's 1929 film adaptation of the play.

Porcasi's other Broadway credits included Oh Mama (1925), The Texas Nightingale (1922), The National Anthem (1922), Jimmie (1920), Little Simplicity (1918), Blind Youth (1917), and Follow Me (1916).

Porcasi's film debut was in Fall of the Romanoffs (1917). He also was seen in MGM's adventure film Tarzan and His Mate (1934).

Porcasi and his wife, Rose Marie, had a son. Porcasi died on 8 August 1946 at his home in Van Nuys, California, aged 67.

Selected filmography

 The Fall of the Romanoffs (1917; uncredited)
 Way Down East (1920) as Party Guest (uncredited)) as 
 Cobra (1925) as Cafe Proprietor (uncredited)
 Say It Again (1926) as Count Tanza
 Broadway (1929) as Nick Verdis
 Murder on the Roof (1930) as Joe Carozzo
 Such Men Are Dangerous (1930) as Monsieur Durand (uncredited)
 The Three Sisters (1930) as Rinaldi
 Born Reckless (1930) as Pa Beretti
 A Lady's Morals (1930) as Maretti
 Morocco (1930) as Lo Tinto
 Derelict (1930) as Masoni
 The Criminal Code (1930) as Tony Spelvin
 Luigi La Volpe (1931) as John Ruskin
 Gentleman's Fate (1931) as Papa Mario Giovanni
 Doctors' Wives (1931) as Dr. Calucci
 The Good Bad Girl (1931) as Tony Pagano
 Svengali (1931) as Bonelli
 Party Husband (1931) as Henri Renard
 Smart Money (1931) as Alexander Amenoppopolus
 Children of Dreams (1931; uncredited)
 El pasado acusa (1931) as Tony Pagano
 Bought! (1931) as Rapello
 Jenny Lind (1931) as Maretti
 Under Eighteen (1931) as François
 The Woman from Monte Carlo (1932) as Minor Role (scenes deleted)
 The Passionate Plumber (1932) as Paul Le Maire
 A Woman Commands (1932) as Cafe Proprietor (uncredited)
 The Man Who Played God (1932) as French Concert Manager (uncredited)
 Stowaway (1932) as Tony
 While Paris Sleeps (1932) as Kapas
 New Morals for Old (1932) as Concierge (uncredited)
 Devil and the Deep (1932) as Hassan
 The Painted Woman (1932) as Nick Machado
 A Parisian Romance (1932) as Deville
 The Red-Haired Alibi (1932) as Margoli
 The Kid from Spain (1932) as Gonzales
 Men Are Such Fools (1932) as Klepak
 Under-Cover Man (1932) as Sam Dorse
 The Death Kiss (1932) as Ellsmith (uncredited)
 A Farewell to Arms (1932) as Harry - Innkeeper (uncredited)
 Cynara (1932) as Joseph, Maitre D'
 The Secret of Madame Blanche (1933) as French Doctor (uncredited)
 Grand Slam (1933) as Nick (uncredited)
 King Kong (1933) as NY Apple Vendor early in film (uncredited)
 Terror Aboard (1933) as Luigi - the Chef
 Hell Below (1933) as Italian Admiral (uncredited)
 Reunion in Vienna (1933) as Chef (uncredited)
 When Strangers Marry (1933) as Phillipe
 The Devil's in Love (1933) as Bartender (uncredited)
 No Marriage Ties (1933) as Angelo, Saloon Proprietor (uncredited)
 He Couldn't Take It (1933) as Nick
 Devil's Mate (1933) as Nick
 I Loved a Woman (1933) as Apopoulis - Hotel Proprietor in Greece (uncredited)
 Footlight Parade (1933) as Apolinaris
 Saturday's Millions (1933) as Felix
 Gigolettes of Paris (1933)
 Big Time or Bust (1933) as Louie
 Havana Widows (1933) as Fernando - Headwaiter (uncredited)
 Roman Scandals (1933) as Chef (uncredited)
 By Candlelight (1933) as Train Conductor (uncredited)
 Flying Down to Rio (1933) as The Mayor
 The Cat and the Fiddle (1934) as Cafe Proprietor (uncredited)
 Coming Out Party (1934) as Manager
 Looking for Trouble (1934) as Cabaret Manager
 Riptide (1934) as House Detective (uncredited)
 Tarzan and His Mate (1934) as Monsieur Feronde (uncredited)
 The Great Flirtation (1934) as Herr Direktor
 His Greatest Gamble (1934) as Innkeeper (uncredited)
 La Cucaracha (1934, short) as Señor Martinez
 Chained (1934) as Mr. Piazza, Hotel Manager (uncredited)
 British Agent (1934) as Count Romano
 Wake Up and Dream (1934) as Polopolis
 The Gay Divorcee (1934) as French Headwaiter (uncredited)
 Imitation of Life (1934) as Jackson's Restaurant Manager (uncredited)
 Million Dollar Baby (1934) as Marvelo No. 1
 Enter Madame (1935) as Archimede
 Rumba (1935) as Carlos
 A Night at the Ritz (1935) as Henri
 The Florentine Dagger (1935) as Antonio
 Baby Face Harrington (1935) as Headwaiter (uncredited)
 Go Into Your Dance (1935) as Show MC (uncredited)
 Under the Pampas Moon (1935) as Headwaiter
 Charlie Chan in Egypt (1935) as Insp. Fouad Soueida
 Broadway Gondolier (1935) as Señor Fuzzi (uncredited)
 Waterfront Lady (1935) as Tony Spadaloni
 Hi, Gaucho! (1935) as General Ortegas
 The Payoff (1935) as Nick
 Stars Over Broadway (1935) as Luigi (uncredited)
 Coronado (1935) as Waiter (uncredited)
 I Dream Too Much (1935) as Uncle Tito
 La Fiesta de Santa Barbara (1935, Short) as himself
 Rose Marie (1936) as Emil - the Chef (uncredited)
 Muss 'em Up (1936) as Luigi Turseniani - Head of the Mob
 The Lady Consents (1936) as Joe - Restaurant Proprietor (uncredited)
 The Leathernecks Have Landed (1936) as Enrico 'Rico' Venetzi
 Mr. Deeds Goes to Town (1936) as Italian Opera Board Member (uncredited)
 Trouble for Two (1936) as Cafe Proprietor (uncredited)
 Down to the Sea (1936) as Vasilios
 Crash Donovan (1936) as Cafe Owner
 Two in a Crowd (1936) as Polito, the Headwaiter (uncredited)
 Seventh Heaven (1937) as Gendarme
 Maytime (1937) as Trentini
 Café Metropole (1937) as Police Official
 That I May Live (1937) as Mr. Scaffa (uncredited)
 The Emperor's Candlesticks (1937) as Santuzzi
 Madame X (1937) as Hotel Gran Via Proprietor (uncredited)
 The Bride Wore Red (1937) as Nobili
 Big Town Girl (1937) as Nightclub Manager (uncredited)
 Crime School (1938) as Nick Papadopolos
 I'll Give a Million (1938) as Cafe Proprietor (uncredited)
 Bulldog Drummond in Africa (1938) as Hotel Manager (uncredited)
 Vacation from Love (1938) as French Judge
 Topper Takes a Trip (1938) as Casino Owner (uncredited)
 Juarez (1939) as Councilman in Meeting with Maximilian (uncredited)
 Lady of the Tropics (1939) as Lamartine
 Everything Happens at Night (1939) as Bartender
 Dr. Kildare's Strange Case (1940) as Antonio "Tony", the Hospital Chef
 I Was an Adventuress (1940) as Fisherman
 Torrid Zone (1940) as Garcia
 Brother Orchid (1940) as Warehouse Manager (uncredited)
 Argentine Nights (1940) as Papa Viejos
 The Border Legion (1940) as Tony
 Moon Over Burma (1940) as Storekeeper
 The Trial of Mary Dugan (1941) as Ship's Captain (uncredited)
 Road to Zanzibar (1941) as Turk at Slave Market (uncredited)
 Two in a Taxi (1941) as Herman
 Rags to Riches (1941) as Professor Del Rio
 Doctors Don't Tell (1941) as Montez
 It Started with Eve (1941) as Armand - the Chef (uncredited)
 Road to Happiness (1941) as Pietro Pacelli
 Casablanca (1942) as Native introducing Ferrari (uncredited)
 Star Spangled Rhythm (1942) as Benito Mussolini—"Sweater, Sarong & Peekaboo Bang" Number (uncredited)
 Quiet Please, Murder (1942) as Rebescu (uncredited)
 Background to Danger (1943) as Customs Official with Joe (uncredited)
 Hi Diddle Diddle (1943) as Impresario
 Melody Parade (1943)
 The Unknown Guest (1943) as Town Barber (uncredited)
 Hot Rhythm (1944) as Mr. Peroni
 Hail the Conquering Hero (1944) as Cafe Owner (uncredited)
 Swing Hostess (1944) as Spumoni
 An American Romance (1944) as Professor Giovanni Cantaloni (uncredited)
 Nothing but Trouble (1944) as Italian Restaurateur (uncredited)
 I'll Remember April (1945) as Popolopolis

References

External links

 
 

1879 births
1946 deaths
20th-century Italian male actors
Expatriate male actors in the United States
Italian expatriates in the United States
Italian male film actors
Italian male silent film actors
RKO Pictures contract players